Marvin, Seth and Stanley is a 2012 American comedy-drama film directed by Stephen Gurewitz, starring Alex Karpovsky, Gurewitz and Gurewitz's father Marvin Gurewitz.

Cast
 Alex Karpovsky as Seth Greenstein
 Stephen Gurewitz as Stanley Greenstein
 Marvin Gurewitz as Marvin Greenstein

Release
The film opened in theatres in Brooklyn on 25 April 2014.

Reception
Richard Brody of The New Yorker called the film the "kind of observational comedy that most observational comedies aren't — because this one is based in actual observation, in an unsparing intimacy regarding the characters, a pitch-perfect ear for the lifetime of emotion packed in an offhanded remark, and a patiently avid camera-eye that follows the characters insistently and pounces on quiet moments of revelation."

Neil Genzlinger of The New York Times wrote that while the characters have a few "nice, even revelatory scenes that combine humor and pain", their "dominant mode of interaction by the movie’s end seems to be silence, just as it was at the beginning, and we never do get to know Marvin or Stanley very well."

Inkoo Kang of The Village Voice wrote that the film's third act "has all the power of a wave, dissolving as quickly as it appears", and that the cinematography "only invites unfavorable comparisons to the more ambitious, psychologically searching interpersonal dramas of that era."

References

External links
 
 

American comedy-drama films
2012 comedy-drama films